New Hanover may refer to:

Places
 New Hanover, Illinois
 New Hanover, KwaZulu-Natal, South Africa
 New Hanover County, North Carolina, United States
 New Hanover Island, a volcanic island in the Bismarck Archipelago of Papua New Guinea
 New Hanover Township, New Jersey, United States 
 New Hanover Township, Pennsylvania, United States

Other uses
 New Hanover High School, Wilmington, North Carolina, United States
 USS New Hanover (AKA-73), a U.S. Navy Tolland-class attack cargo ship
New Hanover, a fictional Western US state in the 2018 video game Red Dead Redemption 2